is a Japanese actress, voice actress and singer who provides voices for anime television series and video games.  In anime shows, she voiced Yoshino Himekawa in Date A Live, Nymph in Heaven's Lost Property, Rinko Kuzaki in Omamori Himari, Haruna in Is This a Zombie?, Mirai Andou in A Dark Rabbit Has Seven Lives, Inaho Kushiya in Maken-ki!, and Funco in Upotte!!. In video games, she voices Celica A. Mercury in the BlazBlue series.

Early acting career 
Nomizu started her acting career portraying Moe Kagami in the Fuji TV live-action drama series Densha Otoko that was broadcast in July 2005. In June 2006, she had a role in the TBS drama series Akihabara@Deep.

She will also appear in mobile phone content such as PlayStation 2 Girls Yoshitsune Densetsu-Tsuki Beyond and Chaku Voice.
She worked as a maid at the Amusement Cafe Meido in Japan, a maid cafe where an active idol opened in November works as a maid.
She became a freelance in October 2007, working as a writer, providing lyrics and composition, and writing novels.

Voice acting career 
In 2009, she joined Production Ace as a voice actress. Her first job after her affiliation was a regular appearance on "Anison ★ Cafe Yumegaoka" broadcast on the channel Television Kanagawa.

In 2011, Nomizu performed the opening theme song "Ma ka se te Tonight" for the anime television adaptation of Is This a Zombie?. In 2012, she formed a voice actor unit sweet ARMS with Misuzu Togashi, Kaori Sadohara, and Misato who co-starred in Upotte!!.

In April 2015, she appeared in “The Queen of Hanikami Noi Izumi's Shy I'm Sorry”, which became the first regular voice actor program at Anime Theater X (AT-X). The program aired until September 2015.

On February 28, 2021, she announced that she has left Production Ace.

Filmography

Anime television
2000
Daa! Daa! Daa! (Kiwi)

2009
Heaven's Lost Property (Nymph)

2010
Omamori Himari (Kuzaki Rinko)
Cat Planet Cuties (Antonia)
Heaven's Lost Property: Forte (Nymph)

2011
Sacred Seven (Fei Zui Lau)
Is This a Zombie? (Haruna)
Deadman Wonderland (Minatsuki Takami)
A Dark Rabbit Has Seven Lives (Andou Mirai)
R-15 (Botan Beni)
Maken-ki! (Inaho Kushiya)

2012
Another (Yumi Ogura)
Ebiten: Kōritsu Ebisugawa Kōkō Tenmonbu (Margaret Elizabeth)
Is This a Zombie? of The Dead (Haruna)
Upotte!! (FNC/Funco)
Seitokai no Ichizon Lv.2 (Mafuyu Shiina)

2013
Problem Children Are Coming from Another World, Aren't They? (Kuro Usagi)
Date A Live (Yoshino Himekawa)
A Certain Scientific Railgun S (Febrie/Janie)
Blood Lad (Fuyumi Yanagi)

2014
Inari, Konkon, Koi Iroha (Akemi Sumizome)
Chaika - The Coffin Princess (Vivi Holopainen)
Date A Live II (Yoshino Himekawa)
Gundam Build Fighters Try (Yomi Sakashita)

2015
Kantai Collection (Shōkaku, Zuikaku)
The Testament of Sister New Devil (Kurumi Nonaka)
Triage X (Haron Mikazuki)
Sky Wizards Academy (Rico Flamel)
Go! Princess PreCure (Yui Nanase)
Anti-Magic Academy: The 35th Test Platoon (Lapis)
The Testament of Sister New Devil BURST (Kurumi Nonaka)

2016
First Love Monster (Yuki Fukaya)

2018
Muhyo & Roji's Bureau of Supernatural Investigation (Nana Takenouchi)

2019
Date A Live III (Yoshino Himekawa)
Hensuki: Are You Willing to Fall in Love with a Pervert, as Long as She's a Cutie? (Mao Nanjō)

2020
Muhyo & Roji's Bureau of Supernatural Investigation Season 2 (Nana Takenouchi)

2022
Date A Live IV (Yoshino Himekawa)
Kantai Collection: Let's Meet at Sea (Shōkaku, Zuikaku)

Films
2011
Heaven's Lost Property the Movie: The Angeloid of Clockwork (Nymph)

2015
Date A Live: The Movie – Mayuri Judgement (Yoshino Himekawa)
Go! Princess PreCure: The Movie (Yui Nanase)

2016
KanColle: The Movie (Shōkaku, Zuikaku)

2017
Pretty Cure Dream Stars (Yui Nanase)

TV Shows
2009
 Anison Cafe★Yumegaoka

Video Games
BlazBlue (Celica A. Mercury)
Sora no Otoshimono Forte: Dreamy Season (Nymph)
Kantai Collection (6 different ships, see list)
Extraordinary Ones (Sandy and Froggy)
Crash Team Racing: Nitro Fueled (Coco Bandicoot)
Girl's Frontline (MP-446, RPD, Z-62)
Ash Arms (A6M Zero)

TV Drama
2006
Densha Otoko Deluxe (Moe Kagami) (Meganekko / posting board member)
Akihabara@Deep (Sūutan)
2005
Densha Otoko (Moe Kagami) (Meganekko / posting board member)

Discography

Mini albums 
[2005.12.21] Alice of... (Indies)
[2011.10.19] Gekkou Catan (月虹カタン)

Studio albums 
[2013.08.21] - Hat Trick

Singles 
[2006.11.08] - Miracle★Drops (ミラクル★ドロップス) (Indies)
[2011.02.09] - Ma·ka·se·te Tonight (魔・カ・セ・テ Tonight)
[2012.04.25] - *** Passionato (*** パショナート)
[2013.01.30] - Black † White
[2013.05.08] - SAVE THE WORLD
[2014.04.23] - DARAKENA

References

External links
Official agency profile  

1985 births
Living people
Anime singers
Japanese women singers
Japanese idols
Japanese video game actresses
Japanese voice actresses
Musicians from Sapporo
Singers from Hokkaido
Voice actresses from Sapporo